Quartet (Birmingham) 1985 is a live album by the composer and saxophonist Anthony Braxton recorded in England in 1985 and released on the Leo label as a double CD in 1991.

Reception

The Allmusic review by Stewart Mason stated, "(Birmingham) 1985 is probably the least essential of the four double-disc sets that Leo devoted to Anthony Braxton's November 1985 tour of Great Britain. Of course, the hardcore Braxton fans who this release is designed for will want it because this tour of Braxton's Forces of Motion Quartet looms fairly large in the composer's legend."

Track listing
All compositions by Anthony Braxton.

Disc one
 First set – 45:10
 "Composition 69M (+10 +33 +96)"	
 "Composition 110A (+96 +108B)"	
 "Composition 60 (+96 +108C)"	
 "Composition 85 (+30 +108D)"

Disc two
 Second set – 44:25
 "Composition 105B (+5 +32 +96)"	
 "Composition 87 (+108C)"	
 "Composition 23J" 	
 "Composition 69H (+31 +96)"	
 "Encore: Composition 40(O)" – 2:45

Personnel 
Anthony Braxton – clarinet, flute, alto saxophone, C melody saxophone, sopranino saxophone
Marilyn Crispell – piano
Mark Dresser – double bass
Gerry Hemingway – drums

References

Leo Records live albums
Anthony Braxton live albums
1991 live albums